Blues Groove is an album by guitarist Tiny Grimes with saxophonist Coleman Hawkins recorded in 1958 and released on the Prestige label. The album was subsequently rereleased under Hawkins leadership.

Reception

Allmusic awarded the album 3 stars and its review by Jim Todd states, "This music will appeal to fans of Grimes' vintage electric guitar and to those interested in an opportunity to hear Hawkins take an extended foray into the blues".

Track listing

Personnel 
 Tiny Grimes – guitar
 Coleman Hawkins – tenor saxophone
 Musa Kaleem – flute
 Ray Bryant – piano
 Earl Womack – double bass
 Teagle Fleming Jr. – drums

References 

Coleman Hawkins albums
Tiny Grimes albums
1958 albums
Albums recorded at Van Gelder Studio
Prestige Records albums
Albums produced by Bob Weinstock